Nyctemera immitans is a moth of the family Erebidae first described by Walter Rothschild in 1915. It is found on Seram in Indonesia.

References

Nyctemerina
Moths described in 1915